Lucien Coëdel (1899–1947) was a French film actor. He appeared in the title role in the historical film Roger la Honte and its sequel The Revenge of Roger. Coëdel made his screen debut in an uncredited role in Abel Gance's Lucrezia Borgia (1935), and gradually appeared in larger roles over the following years. His career really took off in the mid-1940s with several starring roles, but was cut short by his early death at the age of forty eight.

Filmography

References

Bibliography
 Goble, Alan. The Complete Index to Literary Sources in Film. Walter de Gruyter, 1999.

External links

1899 births
1947 deaths
French male film actors
Male actors from Paris